The 1986–87 Eliteserien season was the 30th season of ice hockey in Denmark. Seven teams participated in the league, and Herning IK won the championship. Vojens IK was relegated to the 1. division.

First round

Final round
The top four teams from the first round qualified for the final round. Herning IK finished first in the final round.

External links
Season on eliteprospects.com

Dan
1986-87
1986 in Danish sport
1987 in Danish sport